The family Aplodontiidae also known as Aplodontidae, Haplodontiidae or Haploodontini is traditionally classified as the sole extant family of the suborder Protrogomorpha. It may be the sister family of the Sciuridae.
There are fossils from the Oligocene until Miocene in Asia, from Oligocene in Europe and from the Oligocene until the present in North America, where there is the only living species: the mountain beaver (Aplodontia rufa).

Systematics 
It includes the following genera:
 Aplodontia Richardson, 1829
 †Altasciurus  Korth, 2019
 †Ameniscomys Dehm, 1950
 †Ansomys Qiu, 1987
 †Dakotallomys Tedrow and Korth, 1999
 †Disallomys Korth, 2009
 †Ephemeromys Wang & Heissig, 1984
 †Haplomys Miller and Gidley, 1918
 †Leptoromys Tedrow and Korth, 1997
 †Liodontia Miller and Gidley, 1918
 †Meniscomys Cope, 1879
 †Niglarodon Black, 1961
 †Ninamys Vianey-Liaud, Rodrigues & Marivaux, 2013
 †Oligopetes Heissig, 1979
 †Paracitellus Dehm, 1950
 †Paransomys Vianey-Liaud, Rodrigues & Marivaux, 2013
 †Proansomys Bi, Meng, McLean, Wu, Ni & Ye, 2013
 †Prosciurus Matthew, 1910
 †Pseudaplodon Miller, 1927
 †Sciurodon Schlosser, 1884
 †Selenomys Matthew and Granger, 1923
 †Sewelleladon Shotwell, 1958
 †Tardontia Shotwell, 1958
 †Trigonomys Heissig, 1979

References

Rodent families
Taxa named by Johann Friedrich von Brandt
Extant Oligocene first appearances